Aaron Valero (1913–2000) was an Israeli physician and educator who helped establish hospitals and medical schools, authored medical publications and contributed greatly to the advancement of medical education in Israel in the latter half of the 20th century.

Biography
Aaron Valero was born in Jerusalem to a distinguished Sephardi family which had settled in Palestine in the early 19th century and on his mother's side, in the late 15th century.  His father, Chaim Aharon Valero, was a prominent Jerusalem banker.  Valero's great-grandfather, Jacob Valero, established the first bank in Palestine.  Jacob Saul Elyashar, the father of Valero's great-great-grandmother, had become Chief Rabbi of Palestine in 1893.

Valero was the first to recognise and describe the outbreak of Bubonic Plague in Palestine ("Streptomycin in Bubonic Plague", British Medical Journal, 29 May 1948, pp. 1026–1027). A year later, he observed the outbreak of Rocky Mountain spotted fever in Palestine (Harefuah, Vol. XXXVI, No 9,36, pp. 1–3, 1 May 1949). In his 1953 publication he presented the first reported case of human Ornithosis in the Middle East ("Human Ornithosis in Israel", Harefuah, Vol XLV, No. 5, 1 September 1953).

In the 1960s, Valero recognised the potential for synergy between the clinical medical staff at Rambam Hospital and engineers at the Technion - Israel Institute of Technology.  Valero organised teams from the two institutions, which he headed up. This unique co-operation led to the first product of the soon to be established Biomedical Engineering Department of The Technion – Israel Institute of Technology.  It was an electronic device capable of recording arterial pulsations and the mechanical events of the heart without actually making contact with the chest wall. This device was first described in the American Journal of Cardiology, 19 February 1967, Vol. 19, pp. 224–230 and in subsequent publications (list below).

His first medical book Clinical E.C.G. was published in 1973 by the Technion Michlol publishing house, and his second book, Bedside Detection, was published in 1980.

Valero attended Gymnasia Ivrit in Jerusalem and received an M.B. Ch.B degree from Birmingham University in England in 1938. Upon returning to Jerusalem in 1939, he volunteered to work at the Hadassah Hospital in Jerusalem. In 1941–1946, during World War II, he volunteered to join the British Army's Royal Army Medical Corps as a physician, where he reached the rank of Major. In 1946, he joined the staff of the British Government Hospital, Haifa which later became Rambam Hospital, of which he was a founder. In 1948–1949, during the 1948 Arab-Israeli War he served as a regiment physician on Israel's Northern Front. In 1950, he became Head of the Department of Internal Medicine at Rambam Hospital. In 1956, he became Director of the Israeli Government's Poriya Hospital. In 1972, he was elected a tenured Professor of the Bruce Rappaport Faculty of Medicine of the Technion in Haifa. In 1980, he became the Dean of Medical Education of the Faculty of Medicine at the Technion. In 1980–1986, he also served as Head of the Department of Internal Medicine at Nahariya Hospital in Nahariya. In 2002, The Professor Aaron Valero Fund for the Advancement of Medical Education was established and endowed by the Valero Family in memory of Dr. Valero. The Fund enables guest speakers from Israel and abroad to give workshops, training sessions and to participate in the Professor Aaron Valero Patient – Physician Relationship Day at the Technion.

Published works (partial list)
Valero et al., "Focal Cardiography – An experimental Study in Dogs", Israel Journal of Medical Sciences, Jan–Feb 1969, Vol. 5, No. 1, pp. 13–22
Valero, "Focal Displacement Cardiography for Bedside Detection of Myocardial Dyskinesis", The American Journal of Cardiology, April 1970, Vol 25. pp. 443–449
Valero et al., "Effect of Exercise and Acclimatization on displacement apex Cardiogram in Normal Young Subjects", British Heart Journal January 1971, Vol. 33, No. 1, pp. 37–45
 Valero,"Atrial transport dysfunction in acute myocardial infarction", The American Journal of Cardiology, Volume 16, Issue 1, pp. 22–30

References

Bibliography
Glass and Kark, "Sephardi Entrepreneurs in Jerusalem-The Valero Family 1800–1948" Gefen Publishing House, 2007.
Kark and Glass, "The Valero Family: Seven Generations in Jerusalem, 1800–1949" Gefen Publishing House, 2005. 
Levy, "The History of Medicine in the Holy Land: 1799–1948", Hakibbutz Hameuchad Publishing House and B. Rappaport Faculty of Medicine, Technion – Israel Institute of Technology, Haifa, 1998. 
Hurwich, "Military Medicine in Israel, the pre-state years, 1911–1948" Ministry of Defence Publishing House, 1977. 
Technion – Israel Institute of Technology, Division of Public Affairs and Resource Development
http://www.jerusalemquarterly.org/pdfs/valero.pdf

1913 births
2000 deaths
Royal Army Medical Corps officers
British Army personnel of World War II
Jewish physicians
Israeli infectious disease physicians
Alumni of the University of Birmingham
20th-century Sephardi Jews
Israeli Sephardi Jews
Sephardi Jews in Mandatory Palestine
Academic staff of Technion – Israel Institute of Technology
Jewish scientists
Israeli cardiologists